Nakhimov Residents is a 2022 Russian coming-of-age film directed by Oleg Shtrom. It was theatrically released on July 28, 2022.

Plot 
The film tells about twin brothers Semyon and Timofey Loginov. Their father, a captain of the second rank, a hereditary sailor, wants his sons to continue the military dynasty and build a career in the navy. However, teenagers have completely different plans: the harsh military realities of the boys are not at all impressive, they want to earn money, preferably without putting much effort into it, and lead a carefree life. In pursuit of their dream, the twins get involved with bad company and get into trouble. Loginov Sr. decides to return his sons to the true path and sends them to the Nakhimov Naval School, where they will be made not only worthy people, but also real defenders of the Motherland.

Cast 
 Daniil Khodunov as Semyon Loginov
 Nikita Khodunov as Timofey Loginov
 Vasilisa Shakunova as Masha
 Andrey Merzlikin as Captain Andrey Loginov, Semyon and Timofey's father
 Sergei Garmash as Korneev
 Anna Aleksakhina as Korneev's wife
 Konstantin Raskatov as Valery Gordin
 Ivan Yakimenko as Muratov
 Olga Pavlovets as Vera Loginova
 Ivan Batarev as Stas

Production
The project about the young military was supported by the Ministry of Culture of the Russian Federation, and the Russian Ministry of Defense provided assistance in organizing and conducting filming.

Location filming began in 2020 in Saint Petersburg and lasted for a month - from August 21 to September 30.

References

External links 
 

2022 films
2020s Russian-language films
2020s coming-of-age comedy films
2020s teen comedy films
Russian coming-of-age comedy films
Russian teen comedy films
Films shot in Saint Petersburg